
CVR may refer to:

Business and economics 
 Central Business Register (Denmark), the Danish government register of businesses
 Contingent value rights, in corporate finance, rights granted by an acquirer to a company’s shareholder
 Conversion rate, term used to calculate website visitors in Internet marketing

Transport 
 Churnet Valley Railway, a heritage railway in Staffordshire, England
 Cimarron Valley Railroad, a railway track in the United states
 Cockpit voice recorder, a type of aircraft flight recorder that records audio information
 Colne Valley Railway, a heritage railway in Essex, England
 Combat Vehicle Reconnaissance — two British armoured vehicle series:
Combat Vehicle Reconnaissance (Tracked), or CVR(T)
Fox armoured reconnaissance vehicle, or CVR(W)
 C.V.R. (automobile), French car manufacturer (1906–1907)
 CVR, the ICAO airline designator for Chevron, United States

Other 
 Charlie Victor Romeo, a 1999 play and 2013 film
 Chateauguay Valley Regional High School in Ormstown, Quebec, Canada
 Clyde Valley Racing, a British motorsport team
 Commission vérité et réconciliation, French name of the Truth and Reconciliation Commission (Burundi)
 County of Vermilion River in Alberta, Canada